The Lo Nuestro Award for Album of the Year is an honor presented annually since 2016 by the American television network Univision at the Lo Nuestro Awards. The award was established to recognize the quality of recorded vocal or instrumental albums of Latin music. Nominees and winners are selected based on performance on the Billboard Latin music charts and social media polls, winners are selected via online voting. The trophy awarded is in the shape of a treble clef.

Throughout its history, the Lo Nuestro Awards originally always awarded albums by musical genre, but without any general category. The Album of the Year category was first added in 2016 and has been awarded to date with the exception of 2018 and 2019. The 30th ceremony was held in 2018, and a special program was made instead of voteable categories, while that in 2019 it was decided to omit all album categories.

Winners and nominees

See also 
 Latin Grammy Award for Album of the Year
 Billboard Latin Music Award for Top Latin Album of the Year

References

External links 

Album
Album awards
Awards established in 2016
2016 establishments in the United States